Henri Lindelöf is a Swedish sprint canoer who competed in the late 1950s. He won a bronze medal in the K-1 4 x 500 m event at the 1958 ICF Canoe Sprint World Championships in Prague.

References

Living people
Swedish male canoeists
Year of birth missing (living people)
ICF Canoe Sprint World Championships medalists in kayak